Interferon, type 1, cluster, also known as IFN1@, is a human gene.

References

Further reading